The Ernest Daugherty House is a historic house on Third Street west of Kelly in Hardy, Arkansas.  It is a stone structure, set into a hillside on the north side of Third Street, presenting  stories in the front and 1-1/2 in the rear.  Rectangular in shape, it has a roof with clipped gables, and clipped-gable dormers on the sides, and exposed rafter tails.  Built in 1932, it is an excellent local example of a stone house with Craftsman styling.

The house was listed on the National Register of Historic Places in 1998.

See also
National Register of Historic Places listings in Sharp County, Arkansas

References

Houses on the National Register of Historic Places in Arkansas
Houses completed in 1932
Houses in Sharp County, Arkansas
National Register of Historic Places in Sharp County, Arkansas